The 2014 Grand Prix of Maykop was a one-day women's cycle race held in Russia on 20 May 2014. The race had a UCI rating of 1.2.

Results

See also
 2014 in women's road cycling

References

2014 in women's road cycling
2014 in Russian sport
Grand Prix of Maykop
May 2014 sports events in Russia